Dancing with Time (Tanz mit der Zeit) is a film by  about the autobiography Dance Theater Zeit – tanzen seit 1927 by Heike Hennig.

Plot 
Four dancers, nearing their eighties, take up the challenge of Heike Hennig to return to the stage in Leipzig’s opera house. Ursula Cain, Christa Franze, Siegfried Prölß and Horst Dittmann have been leading members of the Ballet of the Oper Leipzig. A performance of emotional richness combined with the stories of their lives, from Mary Wigman, Gret Palucca to Heike Hennig. Nothing about them is old, except their age.

Dancing with Time was produced as film for TV (f.ex.: ARTE and ZDF) and movie-theaters, as DVD and as book by Marion Appelt, with a preface of Renate Schmidt.

Music
 Jureks Zeit: (J. Lamorski)
 Kalumbo: (C. Meyer/R. Moser)
 Something in the Park: (C. Meyer/R. Moser)
 Give me that old Time Religion: (trad.arr. Moses Hogan) Darek Lee Ragin & The New World Ensemble-Chamber Choir
 Brandenburgische Konzerte: G-dur, Allegro (J. S. Bach)
 Symphony No. 5: C-Sharp minor, Adagietto (G. Mahler) Berliner Philharmoniker - Claudio Abbado
 Dancing with Memories: (C. Meyer)
 Ich sitze gerade Zuhause und werde mir eine Zigarette drehen: Ammer & Console)
 Django Theme: (M. Dietrich/J. Simon/VM De Luxe/O. F. Berdomo) DJ Opossum

Development
Dancing with Time is produced from ma.ja.de filmproduktion in co-produktion with ZDF in collaboration with ARTE, (subtitled) North American Premiere on VIFF in Vancouver 2008

References

External links
 Dancing with Time at the Internet Movie Database
 Heike Hennig & Co Homepage de-en-fr
 OPER Leipzig unplugged - FZTM Homepage

2007 films
Documentary films about modern dance
2007 documentary films
German documentary films
2000s German films